Brian Stafford is a Gaelic footballer.

Brian Stafford may also refer to:

Brian L. Stafford (born 1948), director of the U.S. Secret Service
Brian Stafford (businessman), American businessman